Terumasa (written: 輝政, 皓正 or 晴將) is a masculine Japanese given name. Notable people with the name include:

 (born 1942), Japanese jazz trumpeter
 (1565–1613), Japanese daimyō
 (born 1968), Japanese sumo wrestler

Japanese masculine given names